Trevor Lunn (born 29 June 1946) is an independent politician in Northern Ireland and former member of the Alliance Party.

He was elected to the Northern Ireland Assembly for Lagan Valley in the 2007 assembly election. Lunn took over the Alliance candidacy for Lagan Valley from Seamus Close, the longtime representative for the area. While many pundits predicted that Alliance would struggle to hold on to the seat, Lunn's performance saw the new candidate elected fourth out of the six seats available. He retained the seat at the 2011 Assembly election. He is a former chairman of the Alliance Party.

As at August 2015, he is a Political Member of the Northern Ireland Policing Board.

Lunn has been a councillor for Lisburn since 2001, serving as deputy mayor for the term 2005/6 and was elected as mayor of the City of Lisburn on 22 June 2006.

Regarding accusations in 2012 of Sinn Féin infiltrating primary schools,  Lunn said, "In the context of Lumen Christi as a highly successful grammar school which has taken a public stance on the question of academic selection, in defiance of the minister's instruction and indeed the view of the Catholic Church, it is hard to see these appointments as anything other than a means of infiltration of the school's board of governors, with the aim of influencing the stance taken by the present board."

On 2 March 2020, Lunn announced that he was leaving the Alliance Party due to "internal difficulties"; he continued to sit as an independent MLA. He announced that he would not be contesting the 2022 Northern Ireland Assembly election.

References

1946 births
Living people
Alliance Party of Northern Ireland councillors
Alliance Party of Northern Ireland MLAs
Mayors of places in Northern Ireland
Members of Lisburn City Council
Northern Ireland MLAs 2007–2011
Northern Ireland MLAs 2011–2016
Northern Ireland MLAs 2016–2017
Northern Ireland MLAs 2017–2022
Place of birth missing (living people)